This is a list of Albanian screenwriters.

Screenwriters
 Fatmir Gjata (1922–1989)
 Llazar Siliqi (1924–2001)
 Vath Koreshi (1936–2006)
 Anastas Kondo (1937–2006)
 Nexhati Tafa (born 1952)
 Elvira Dones (born 1960)
 Nijazi Ramadani (born 1964)

References

Albanian screenwriters